The National Defense Industrial Association (NDIA) is a trade association for the United States government and defense industrial base. It is an 501(c)3 educational organization. Its headquarters are in Arlington, Virginia. NDIA was established in 1919 as a result of the inability of the defense industry to scale up the war effort during World War I.

Founding
In 1917, Brigadier General Benedict Crowell was called to active duty and served on the General Munitions Board. As a board member, he established a relationship with the steel industry and was almost immediately appointed Assistant Secretary of War and Director of Munitions. As Director of Munitions, Crowell was a significant catalyst in improving the country's capability to produce arms and ammunition. However, he recognized the nation's need for an association that fostered cooperation between civilian industry and government in support of industrial preparedness. He founded the Army Ordnance Association (AOA) in 1919 and served as president for its first 25 years. Over the ensuing decades, AOA became the American Defense Preparedness Association (ADPA), which then merged with the 1944 National Security Industrial Association (NSIA) in 1997, creating NDIA.

Publications
NDIA currently publishes National Defense Magazine, Weekly Policy Digest, Weekly Defense Insider, and Monthly Defense Watch.

National Defense magazine 
National Defense has been published under a series of different titles since 1940:
 2005-Present - National Defense
 1947-1954 - The Common Defense
 1947-1970 - Ordnance
 1920-1945 - Army Ordnance
 1945-1947 - Logistics
 1946 - Industrial Preparedness Bulletin
 1943-1945 - Army Ordnance Report
 1940-1946 - Army Ordnance Bulletin

Chapters

NDIA has 29 chapters located throughout the United States.

Divisions
NDIA consists of subject-specific divisions that aim to promote defense and national security through access, influence, and education.

Committees and working groups
NDIA has 5 industrial committees and working groups that bring government and industry personnel together on important topics.

See also
 Military–industrial complex
 National defense
 Warfighter

References

External links
 

Military industry
United States military associations
Military simulation